The 29th Infantry Division (29-ya Pekhotnaya Diviziya) was an infantry formation of the Russian Imperial Army. It was part of the 20th Army Corps.

Organization
1st Brigade
113th Starorus Russian Infantry Regiment "Old"
114th Infantry Regiment "Novotorzhsky"
2nd Brigade
115th Infantry Regiment "Vyazemsky"
116th Infantry Regiment "Maloyaroslavsky"
29th Artillery Brigade

Commanders
1863-1864: Mikhail Likhutin
1869-1878: Alexander Alekseyevich Svechin
1890-1896: Nikolay Dmitrievich Tatischev
1914-1915: Anatoly Rosenshield

Chiefs of Staff
1863: Nikolay Matveyevich Turbin
1875-1876: Mitrofan Petrovich Tchaikovsky
1889-1896: Ivan Nadarov

Commanders of the 1st Brigade
1902-1906: Alexander Iosafovich Ievreinov

References

Infantry divisions of the Russian Empire
Military units and formations disestablished in 1918